The Bayernliga (English: Bavarian league) is the highest amateur football league and the second highest football league (under the Regionalliga Bayern) in the state of Bavaria and the Bavarian football league system. It is one of fourteen Oberligas in German football, the fifth tier of the German football league system. Until the introduction of the 3. Liga in 2008 it was the fourth tier of the league system, until the introduction of the Regionalligas in 1994 the third tier.

From the 2012–13 season onwards, the league has been divided once more into a northern and a southern division, having previously placed in single division format since 1963. The league sits directly under the Regionalliga Bayern and above the Landesligas, which were expanded in number from three to five at the end of the 2011–12 season.

Overview

Landesliga Bayern: 1945–1950 
The league was formed in 1945 from nine clubs as the Landesliga Bayern, being then the second tier of the German football league system, right below the Oberliga Süd in the re-formed state of Bavaria, then part of the US occupation zone in Germany. The league run then in parallel with the Landesligas of Hessen, Württemberg and Nordbaden.

The league expanded in its second season to two divisions of eleven teams each, the Staffel Nordbayern and Staffel Südbayern with the league champions playing each other for the Bavarian championship and promotion. The year after, the leagues went to thirteen teams each.

In 1948, the league was reunited in one group of sixteen teams with the top-two clubs gaining promotion. The 1949–50 season was run on fourteen clubs with the top-five clubs gaining promotion to the new 2. Oberliga Süd.

Amateurliga Bayern: 1950–1953 
The league was renamed Amateurliga Bayern, a name it would carry until 1978, and was now the third tier of the league system, below the 2nd Oberliga. It consisted of sixteen clubs in its first season, then went to eighteen and later nineteen.

Amateurliga Nordbayern and Südbayern: 1953–1963 
In 1953, the league split into a northern and a southern group again, each with fifteen clubs. The main reasons for this was to reduce travel-costs and time, but also to create two regional champions in Bavaria which both could take part in the promotion rounds to the 2nd Oberliga instead of only one. Being the largest of the southern German federations, Bavaria felt disadvantaged by the fact that only its champion was permitted to take part in the promotion rounds.

The number of teams in the two leagues kept fluctuating and sometimes clubs from central Bavaria were moved between divisions to balance out the strength.

In those years up to 1963, the leagues below the Bayernliga were the 2. Amateurligas, which there was supposed to be seven of, according to the number of Bezirke in Bavaria. However, some, like Oberbayern, split their 2nd Amateurliga in more than one division.

Amateurliga Bayern: 1963–1978 
In 1963, with the introduction of the Bundesliga, the Oberliga Süd and 2nd Oberliga Süd were disbanded. The Amateurliga Bayern was reunited and now came under the Regionalliga Süd, the new second tier of the league system in the south. The Amateurliga retained its status as a tier three league.

Seven clubs from the northern and southern division each plus four from the 2nd Oberliga made up the newly reunited league in 1963. The league champion still had to compete for promotion with the winners of the other southern German amateur leagues while the bottom three teams were relegated. Below the Bayernliga, three Landesligas were established and remain there to this date, with their champions directly promoted:

 Landesliga Bayern-Nord, covering Unterfranken and Oberfranken
 Landesliga Bayern-Mitte, covering Mittelfranken, Oberpfalz and Niederbayern
 Landesliga Bayern-Süd, covering Schwaben and Oberbayern

The league remained unchanged throughout the coming years, until 1974, when the Regionalliga was replaced by the 2. Bundesliga Süd. For the Bayernliga, this still meant little change, the winner still had to play-off for promotion to the new league.

Amateur-Oberliga Bayern: 1978–1994 
The year 1978 saw a reformation of the highest Amateurligas in Germany, their number was halved from sixteen to eight, making direct promotion for the southern champions possible for the first time. The Amateurligas were also renamed Amateur-Oberligas, which was generally shortened to AOL or, more commonly, just Oberliga. In the south, this meant the Bayernliga now run parallel to the Amateur-Oberligas of Hessen, Baden-Württemberg and Südwest.

Direct promotion for the southern champions only lasted two seasons however, 1978–79 and 1979–80. In 1981, the 2. Bundesliga was united to one single division, making it necessary for the Oberliga champions to have a promotion round again. In this season, the Bavarian FA (German: Bayrischer Fußball Verband) also introduced a promotion round for the Landesligas, meaning the three second placed teams in those leagues played the fourth-last Bayernliga team for one more spot in the league. In some seasons, additional promotion spots were available, for example when the Bayernliga champion managed to move up to the 2nd Bundesliga.

Oberliga Bayern: 1994–2012
After having been a tier three league for 44 seasons, the re-introduction of the Regionalligas, now at this level, made the Bayernliga slip to tier four. It also adopted a new, shorter name, being simply called Oberliga Bayern now, because the highest (German: Oberste) amateur league was now the Regionalliga.

The six teams with the best overall record over the last three seasons in the Bayernliga, or above, gained entry to the new Regionalliga Süd, these being:

 FC Augsburg
 SV Lohhof
 SpVgg Unterhaching
 FC Bayern Munich II
 SpVgg Fürth
 TSV Vestenbergsgreuth

This fact also allowed a greater number of clubs then usually to move up from the Landesliga.

But above all, for the first time since 1980, the Bavarian champion was directly promoted again, now to the Regionalliga. The one exception for this was the year 2000, when the number of Regionalligas was reduced from four to two.

The year 2008 saw another league system change. The 3. Liga was introduced to slide between 2nd Bundesliga and Regionalligas. For the Bayernliga this meant a further fall, to tier five now. However, its best four teams of this season gained entry to the Regionalliga, providing their finances complied with the leagues regulations, those clubs being:

 SpVgg Greuther Fürth II
 1. FC Nuremberg II
 TSV Großbardorf
 1. FC Eintracht Bamberg
 SpVgg Unterhaching II

The Bayernliga champion, SpVgg Bayreuth, was refused a Regionalliga licence, Bamberg took its spot instead. Due to the Sportfreunde Siegen also being denied a licence, another Bavarian team was promoted to the Regionalliga, this being the reserve team of Unterhaching.

Bayernliga Nord and Süd: from 2012 
In October 2010, another reform of the Regionalligas was decided upon. The number of leagues were now to be expanded to five, with the defunct Regionalliga Nordost to be reestablished and a Regionalliga Bayern to be established. Also, the Regionalliga West would lose the clubs from the south west to a new league, formed out of those clubs and the clubs from Regionalliga Süd without the Bavarian teams. The new system came into operation in the 2012–13 season. It was also decided to limit the number of reserve teams per Regionalliga to seven.

The Bavarian football federation carried out drastic changes to the league system from 2012 onwards. With the already decided introduction of the Regionalliga Bayern from 2012 to 2013, it placed two Bayernligas below the new league as the new fifth tier of the German league system. Below those, five Landesligas instead of the existing three were set which are geographically divided to limit travel and increase the number of local derbies. This model was adopted in late April 2011. With the league reform at the end of the 2011–12 season, the Bezirksoberligas were also disbanded. Instead, the Bezirksligas took the place of the Bezirksoberligas once more below the Landesligas, a system already in place from 1963 to 1988.

While it was originally thought that the Regionalliga Bayern would carry the name Bayernliga, it was later revealed that the current Bayernliga would have that honour, making the Bayernliga a divided league as it had been from 1953 to 1963. The new qualification mode would see all current Bavarian Regionalliga teams qualify for the new league as well as the top nine of the Bayernliga. Additionally, the teams placed 10th to 15th entered a promotion round with, nominally the six Landesliga champions and runners-up for three more spots in the new league, but dependent on licensing for the new league. Fluctuations of this formula were however also possible if a Bavarian club was promoted to or relegated from the 3rd Liga.

The losers of the Regionalliga qualification round, nine clubs, and the Landesliga clubs placed third to eighth, 18 clubs, all entered the new Bayernligas, as did the winners of the Bayernliga promotion round between the Landesliga clubs placed eleventh to 15th and the Bezirksoberliga champions. The Landesliga clubs that failed to qualify for the Bayernligas remained in one of the five new Landesligas; there was no relegation to the Bezirksligas.

League timeline
The league went through the following timeline of name changes, format and position in the league system:

Champions of the Bayernliga

1945–1953 
In 1945–46, the Landesliga Bayern was played as a single division, in 1946–47 and 1947–48 it was played in two regional divisions with a home-and-away final to determine the Bavarian champion. From 1948 to 1953, it was played as a single division again:

1953–1963 
From 1953 to 1963, the Bayernliga was divided into a northern and a southern group again. From 1956 onwards, a Bavarian final was held again:

1963–2012 
From 1963 onwards, the Bayernliga was always held as a single division. From 1963 to 1980 and from 1995 onwards, the league champion had the right to direct promotion. In 1974 and 1981, no promotion was available and from 1982 to 1994, the league champion had to participate in the promotion round. When the league champion declined, as has happened twice, the runners-up was promoted/qualified for the promotion round:

2012–present 
Since 2012 the Bayernliga has once more been divided into a northern and a southern group:

 
 1 FC Wacker München declined promotion, Würzburger FV promoted as runners-up.
 2 1. FC Haßfurt declined promotion, MTV Ingolstadt promoted as runners-up.
 3 SpVgg Bayreuth was refused a Regionalliga licence.
 4 FC Ismaning declined promotion, runners-up FC Ingolstadt II promoted instead.
 5 BC Aichach declined promotion and withdrew from the Bayernliga, VfR Garching promoted instead.
 6 SV Pullach declined promotion, runners-up FC Unterföhring promoted instead.
 7 The 2019–20 season was interrupted by the coronavirus disease 2019 (COVID-19) pandemic in Germany that was declared in March 2020. It was later suspended until 31 August, forcing a cancellation of the 2020–21 season as the BFV approved a resumption of the preceding one, which was curtailed in May 2021.

Recent top scorers
The top scorers in the league since 2005:

Bayernliga until 2012

Bayernliga North

Bayernliga South

 1 Peter Heyer scored 19 goals in the 2007–08 season but since Bamberg'''s 1–0 win against Memmingen, where he scored, was later changed to a 0-x loss due to Bamberg using two non-eligible players, only 18 of his goals were officially recognised.

League placings since 2012

The complete list of clubs and placings in the Bayernliga since the league was sub-divided into two divisions:

Bayernliga Nord 2012–present
The complete list of clubs and placings in the Bayernliga Nord since the league was sub-divided into two divisions:

Bayernliga Süd 2012–present
The complete list of clubs and placings in the Bayernliga Süd since the league was sub-divided into two divisions:

Placings for 2020 were based on the tables at the point of suspension during the coronavirus pandemic. Final placings were determined on a points per game basis at the curtailment of the resumed 2019–20 season in 2021.

Key

League records 1963–2012
The league records in regards to points, wins, losses and goals for the clubs in the league are:

 References 

Sources
 Die Bayernliga 1945–1997,  published by the DSFS, 1998
 Deutschlands Fußball in Zahlen,  An annual publication with tables and results from the Bundesliga to Verbandsliga/Landesliga, DSFS
 Kicker Almanach,  The yearbook on German football from Bundesliga to Oberliga, since 1937, published by the Kicker Sports Magazine
 Süddeutschlands Fußballgeschichte in Tabellenform 1897–1988  History of Southern German football in tables, publisher & author: Ludolf Hyll
 50 Jahre Bayrischer Fußball-Verband  50-year-anniversary book of the Bavarian FA. Vindelica Verlag. 1996.
 Die Deutsche Liga-Chronik 1945–2005  History of German football from 1945 to 2005 in tables. DSFS. 2006.

 External links 
 Bayrischer Fußball Verband (Bavarian FA) 
 Das deutsche Fußball Archiv Historic German league tables 
 Bavarian League tables and results 
 Website with tables and results from the Bavarian Oberliga to Bezirksliga 
 Weltfussball.de Round-by-round results and tables of the Bayernliga'' from 1994 onwards 

 
Oberliga (football)
1945 establishments in Germany
2